The Missourians is a 1950 American Western film directed by George Blair and written by Arthur E. Orloff. The film stars Monte Hale, Paul Hurst, Roy Barcroft, Lyn Thomas, Howard Negley and Scott Elliott. The film was released as a Fawcett Movie Comic#7 on November 25, 1950, by Republic Pictures.

Plot

Cast
Monte Hale as Marshal Bill Blades
Paul Hurst as John X. Finn
Roy Barcroft as Nick Kovacs
Lyn Thomas as Peg Finn
Howard Negley as Lucius Valentine
Scott Elliott as Steve Kovacs 
Lane Bradford as Lead henchman
John Hamilton as Mayor Grant McDowall
Sarah Padden as Mother Kovacs
Charles Williams as Postmaster Walt
Perry Ivins as Judge

References

External links 
 

1950 films
American Western (genre) films
1950 Western (genre) films
Republic Pictures films
Films directed by George Blair
Films adapted into comics
American black-and-white films
1950s English-language films
1950s American films